Trupanea metoeca is a species of tephritid or fruit flies in the genus Trupanea of the family Tephritidae.

Distribution
Peru, Chile, Argentina.

References

Tephritinae
Insects described in 1914
Diptera of South America